Batugoda Rankoth Gedara Nirosha Kumari  (born 9 May 1984), known as Nirosha Kumari, is a former Sri Lankan woman cricketer. Nirosha made her Women's One Day International debut at the 2006 Women's Asia Cup. She played for Sri Lanka in two Women's One Day Internationals.

References

External links 

1984 births
Living people
Sri Lankan women cricketers
Sri Lanka women One Day International cricketers
Cricketers from Kandy
Marians women cricketers